The 2006 Canadian Mixed Curling Championship was held November 19–26, 2005 at the Whitehorse Curling Club (Mount McIntyre Recreation Centre) in Whitehorse, Yukon. Team Ontario, consisting of skip John Epping, third Julie Reddick, second Scott Foster and lead Leigh Armstrong, won the championship after being seeded 3rd following the round robin. Ontario defeated Manitoba (consisting of David Hamblin, Kristen Williamson, Ross Derksen and Kendra Green) 11-3 in the final.

Teams

Standings

Results

Draw 1

Draw 2

Draw 3

Draw 4

Draw 5

Draw 6

Draw 7

Draw 8

Draw 9

Draw 10

Draw 11

Playoffs

Semifinal

Final

External links
Event statistics

References

2005 in Yukon
Canadian Mixed Curling Championship
Curling in Yukon
2005 in Canadian curling
November 2005 sports events in Canada
Sport in Whitehorse